Kevin Budinauckas (born 16 September 1974 in Bellshill) is a Scottish former footballer, who played as a goalkeeper.

Throughout his career he has played for Stenhousemuir, Partick Thistle, Clyde, Brechin City on loan and Stranraer in the senior game.

He also had a couple of spells in junior football at Wishaw and Linlithgow Rose, Cumnock, Pollok and Armadale.

Budinauckas is currently the goalkeeping coach at Stirling Albion.

External links

Living people
1974 births
Footballers from Bellshill
Scottish footballers
Association football goalkeepers
Brechin City F.C. players
Clyde F.C. players
Partick Thistle F.C. players
Stenhousemuir F.C. players
Stranraer F.C. players
Scottish Football League players
Scottish Premier League players
Scottish Junior Football Association players
Linlithgow Rose F.C. players
Scottish people of Lithuanian descent
Scotland junior international footballers
Association football goalkeeping coaches